"This Time" is a song by Canadian R&B singer Melanie Fiona from her second studio album, The MF Life (2012). The song was produced by No I.D., written by Ernest Wilson, Johnta Austin, Steve Wyreman, Kevin Randolph, J. Cole. The song features vocals from American hip hop recording artist and record producer J. Cole.

Music video
A music video to accompany the release of "This Time" was first released onto YouTube on June 18, 2012 at a total length of three minutes and forty-seven seconds.

Track listing

Personnel
Lead vocals – Melanie Fiona
Producer's – No I.D.
Lyrics – E. Wilson, Johnta Austin, Steve Wyreman, Kevin Randolph, J. Cole
Label: SRC, Universal Republic

Chart performance

References

2012 singles
2011 songs
Melanie Fiona songs
J. Cole songs
Songs written by No I.D.
Songs written by Johntá Austin
Songs written by J. Cole
Song recordings produced by No I.D.
Music videos directed by Colin Tilley
SRC Records singles